Phanuel Egejuru is a Nigerian writer and academician, whose areas of focus are composition, short fiction, Black literature and aesthetics, 19th-century British fiction and Victorian England. She is best known for her 1993 novel The Seed Yams Have Been Eaten. 

Egejuru studied in Nigeria, Senegal, Ivory Coast and France. She then attended the University of Minnesota, graduating magna cum laude in French. After moving to the University of California, Los Angeles (UCLA), she obtained her MA, MPH and PhD in comparative literature. 

She taught at UCLA, and in Tanzania, New York, Nigeria and Rhode Island, before moving to Loyola Marymount University.

Books 
Egejuru's books include:
Black Writers, White Audience: A Critical Approach to African Literature (1978)
Towards African Literary Independence: A Dialogue with Contemporary African Writers (1980)
Chinua Achebe: Pure and Simple, An Oral Biography (2003)
Womanbeing and Womanself: Characters in Black Women's Novels (2011)

References

External links 
 Profile at Loyola University New Orleans
 ResearchGate profile

20th-century Nigerian women writers
Living people
Loyola University New Orleans faculty
University of California, Los Angeles faculty
University of Minnesota College of Liberal Arts alumni
Year of birth missing (living people)